The 2014 United States House of Representatives elections in North Carolina were held on Tuesday, November 4, 2014 to elect the 13 U.S. representatives from the state of North Carolina, one from each of the state's 13 congressional districts. The elections coincided with other elections to the United States Senate and House of Representatives and various state and local elections, including an election to the U.S. Senate.

Primary elections were held on Tuesday, May 6, 2014. In primaries in which no candidate won more than 40% of the vote (the Democratic primary in the 5th district and the Republican primary in the 6th district), second primary elections (runoffs) were held between the top two candidates on July 15, 2014.

Overview

District
Results of the 2014 United States House of Representatives elections in North Carolina by district:

District 1

The 1st district is located in Northeastern North Carolina and includes towns such as Durham, Elizabeth City, Henderson, Roanoke Rapids, Rocky Mount, Goldsboro and New Bern. The incumbent is Democrat G. K. Butterfield, who has represented the district since 2004. He was re-elected with 75% of the vote in 2012 and the district has a PVI of D+19.

Democratic primary

Candidates

Nominee 
G. K. Butterfield, incumbent U.S. Representative

Eliminated in primary
Dan Whittacre, High School Teacher, HHS Federal Agent, and candidate for this district in 2012

Withdrawn
Rodward Hewlin

Results

Republican primary

Candidates

Nominee
Arthur Rich, accountant and candidate for lieutenant governor in 2012

Eliminated in primary
Brent Shypulefski

Results

General election

Endorsements

Results

District 2

The 2nd district is located in central North Carolina and includes all or parts of Alamance, Chatham, Cumberland, Harnett, Hoke, Lee, Moore, and Wake counties. The incumbent is Republican Renee Ellmers, who has represented the district since 2011. She was re-elected with 56% of the vote in 2012 and the district has a PVI of R+10.

Ellmers had considered running for the U.S. Senate but instead ran for re-election.

Republican primary

Candidates

Nominee
Renee Ellmers, incumbent U.S. Representative

Eliminated in primary
Frank Roche, conservative internet talk show host and lecturer in economics at Elon University, candidate for North Carolina's 4th congressional district in 2010 & candidate for State Treasurer in 2012

Declined
Jim Duncan, chair of the Chatham County Republican Party, co-founder of the grassroots organization The Coalition for American Principles

Results

Democratic primary

Candidates

Nominee
Clay Aiken, singer, actor and activist

Eliminated in primary
Keith Crisco, former North Carolina Secretary of Commerce 
Toni Morris, professional counselor and candidate for the district in 2012 .

Withdrawn
Houston Barnes, attorney (endorsed Aiken)

Results

The results were too close to call even a week later, with Crisco only narrowly behind Aiken, who was only just above the 40% necessary to avoid a runoff. As both candidates were waiting for the results to be certified (this was to be done May 13, 2014), Crisco died suddenly on May 12, after suffering a fall in his home. He was 71. Though Crisco had initially said he would not concede,  he changed his mind and had planned to concede on May 13.

General election

Endorsements

Polling

Results

District 3

The 3rd district is located on the Atlantic coast of North Carolina. It covers the Outer Banks and the counties adjacent to the Pamlico Sound. The incumbent is Republican Walter B. Jones, Jr., who has represented the district since 1995. He was re-elected with 63% of the vote in 2012 and the district has a PVI of R+11.

Taylor Griffin, a one-time aide to United States Senator Jesse Helms and to President George W. Bush, ran in the primary against Jones. Griffin sold his consulting firm in Washington, D.C., and moved back to New Bern.

Republican primary

Candidates

Nominee
Walter Jones, incumbent U.S. Representative

Eliminated in primary
Albin "Big Al" Novinec
Taylor Griffin, former aide to Senator Jesse Helms and President George W. Bush

Declined
Scott Dacey, Craven County Commissioner

Jason Thigpen, a U.S. Army veteran and founder of the Student Veterans Advocacy Group, first announced that he would challenge Jones in the Republican primary, but then left the Republican Party and said he would run as a Democrat. Ultimately, he did not file to run for any party's nomination.

Endorsements

Results

Democratic primary

Candidates

Nominee
 Marshall Adame, retired U.S. Marine, former U.S. Diplomat in Iraq, former member of the Congressional Commission on Wartime Contracting in Iraq and Afghanistan and former U.S. Basra International Airport Director

General election

Endorsements

Results

District 4

The 4th district is located in northern North Carolina and includes Orange, Durham, Harnett, Chatham and Wake counties. The incumbent is Democrat David Price, who has represented the district since 1997, and previously represented it from 1987 to 1995. He was re-elected with 74% of the vote in 2012 and the district has a PVI of D+20.

Democratic primary

Candidates

Nominee 
David Price, incumbent U.S. Representative

Republican primary

Candidates

Nominee 
Paul Wright, attorney, former District Court & Superior Court judge and candidate for Governor of North Carolina in 2012

General election

Endorsements

Results

District 5

The 5th district is located in northwestern North Carolina, from the Appalachian Mountains to the Piedmont Triad and includes Watauga, Ashe, Wilkes, Alexander, Iredell, Davie, Yadkin, Surry, Alleghany, Forsyth, Stokes and Reckingham counties. The incumbent is Republican Virginia Foxx, who has represented the district since 2005. She was re-elected with 58% of the vote in 2012 and the district has a PVI of R+11.

Foxx had considered running for the U.S. Senate but is instead running for re-election.

Republican primary

Candidates

Nominee 
Virginia Foxx, incumbent U.S. Representative

Eliminated in primary
Philip Doyle

Results

Democratic primary

Candidates

Nominee
Joshua Brannon, software developer

Eliminated in primary
 Gardenia Henley, retired U.S. Agency for International Development auditor, candidate for state representative in 2010, for governor in 2012 and for Mayor of Winston-Salem in 2013
Michael W. Holleman
Will Stinson, candidate for state representative in 2012.

Results

Runoff
Because Brannon did not secure more than 40 percent of the vote, he and Henley advanced to a runoff.

General election

Endorsements

Results

District 6

The 6th district is located in northern North Carolina and includes all of Caswell, Person, Rockingham, Surry and Stokes counties as well as parts of Guilford, Alamance, Durham, Granville and Orange counties. The incumbent is Republican Howard Coble, who has represented the district since 1985. He was re-elected with 61% of the vote in 2012 and the district has a PVI of R+10.

Citing his health, Coble announced on November 7, 2013, that he would retire and not seek another term in 2014.

Republican primary

Candidates

Nominee
 Mark Walker, pastor

Eliminated in primary
 Phil Berger Jr., Rockingham County District Attorney
 Mike Causey, former insurance agent and nominee for North Carolina Commissioner of Insurance in 2012
 Kenn Kopf, attorney
 Zack Matheny, businessman and Greensboro City Councilman
 Jeff Phillips, financial adviser, Guilford County Commissioner and candidate for this seat in 2010
 Charlie Sutherland, retired businessman and candidate for District 13 in 2006
 Bruce VonCannon, retired banker
 Don Webb, financial adviser and Piedmont Triad International Airport Authority member

Declined
 Howard Coble, incumbent U.S. Representative

Polling

Endorsements

Results

Runoff
Because Berger did not win more than 40 percent of the vote, he and Walker advanced to a runoff, which Walker won.

Democratic primary

Candidates

Nominee
 Laura Fjeld, attorney and former vice president of the University of North Carolina system

Eliminated in primary
 Bruce Davis, Guilford County Commissioner and candidate for the state senate in 2008, 2010 and 2012

Results

General election

Endorsements

Polling

Results

District 7

The 7th district is located in southeastern North Carolina and includes Robeson, Cumberland, Sampson, Bladen, Columbus, Brunswick, New Hanover, Pender and Duplin counties. The incumbent is Democrat Mike McIntyre, who has represented the district since 1997. He was re-elected with 50% of the vote in 2012 and the district has a PVI of R+12.

Democratic primary

Candidates

Nominee
Jonathan Barfield, Jr., New Hanover County Commissioner

Eliminated in primary
Walter A. Martin, Jr., Princeton Town Commissioner

Declined
Mike McIntyre, incumbent U.S. Representative

Results

Republican primary

Candidates

Nominee
David Rouzer, former state senator from the 12th district and nominee for this district in 2012

Eliminated in primary
Chris Andrade
Haywood "Woody" White, New Hanover County Commissioner and former state senator

Results

Minor parties
Attorney J. Wesley Casteen, who ran for a seat on the North Carolina Court of Appeals in 2010, is the Libertarian Party nominee.  Louis Harmati, who ran for the state legislature as a Republican in 2012, ran as a write-in candidate.

General election

Endorsements

Polling

Predictions

Results

District 8

The 8th district is located in Southern North Carolina and includes all of Anson County, Montgomery County, Richmond County, Scotland County and Stanly County, as well as portions of Cabarrus County, Davidson County, Mecklenburg County, Randolph County, Robeson County, Rowan County and Union County. The incumbent is Republican Richard Hudson, who has represented the district since 2013. He was elected in 2012, defeating Democratic incumbent Larry Kissell with 53% of the vote. The district has a PVI of R+11.

Republican primary

Candidates

Nominee
Richard Hudson, incumbent U.S. Representative

Democratic primary

Candidates

Nominee
Antonio Blue, Mayor of Dobbins Heights, U.S. Army veteran and write-in candidate for this district in 2012

General election

Endorsements

Results

District 9

The 9th district is located in south-central North Carolina and includes parts of Iredell, Mecklenburg and Union counties. The incumbent is Republican Robert Pittenger, who has represented the district since 2013. He was elected with 52% of the vote in 2012, succeeding retiring Republican incumbent Sue Myrick. The district has a PVI of R+8.

Pittenger had considered running for the U.S. Senate but is instead running for re-election.

No Democrat filed to run for the seat, making this district the only one in the state not being contested by both major parties in 2014. There is a write-in campaign for candidate Shawn Eckles of Iredell County.

Republican primary

Candidates

Nominee 
Robert Pittenger, incumbent U.S. Representative

Eliminated in primary
Michael Steinberg, businessman and candidate for this seat in 2012.

Results

General election

Endorsements

Results

District 10

The 10th district is located in central and western North Carolina and includes all of Cleveland, Gaston, Lincoln and Rutherford counties and parts of Catawba, Iredell and Buncombe counties. The incumbent is Republican Patrick McHenry, who has represented the district since 2005. He was re-elected with 57% of the vote in 2012 and the district has a PVI of R+11.

McHenry had considered running for the U.S. Senate but is instead running for re-election.

Republican primary

Candidates

Nominee
Patrick McHenry, incumbent U.S. Representative

Eliminated in primary
Richard Lynch, business owner and candidate for North Carolina's 9th congressional district in 2012.

Results

Democratic primary

Candidates

Nominee
Tate MacQueen, High school social studies teacher and soccer coach

Declined
Terry Bellamy, Mayor of Asheville and candidate for this seat in 2012

General election

Endorsements

Results

District 11

The 11th district is located in western North Carolina and includes Yancey, McDowell, Rutherford, Polk, Henderson, Buncombe, Madison, Haywood, Jackson, Transylvania, Swain, Macon, Clay, Graham and Cherokee counties. The incumbent is Republican Mark Meadows, who has represented the district since 2013. He was elected with 57% of the vote in 2012, succeeding retiring Democratic incumbent Heath Shuler. The district has a PVI of R+13.

Republican primary

Candidates

Nominee
Mark Meadows, incumbent U.S. Representative

Democratic primary

Candidates

Nominee
Tom Hill, physicist and candidate for this seat in 2012

Eliminated in primary
Keith Ruehl, businessman and volunteer firefighter

Results

General election

Endorsements

Results

District 12

The 12th district is located in central North Carolina and includes parts of Charlotte, Winston-Salem, Greensboro, Lexington, Salisbury, Concord, and High Point. Democrat Mel Watt held this seat from 1993 until he resigned on January 6, 2014, to become director of the Federal Housing Finance Agency. The special election to fill the seat for the remainder of the current Congress will be held concurrently with the regular 2014 elections. Watt was re-elected with 80% of the vote in 2012 and the district has a PVI of D+26.

Democratic primary

Candidates

Nominee
 Alma Adams, state representative

Eliminated in primary
 George Battle III, general counsel to the Charlotte-Mecklenburg school board
 Marcus Brandon, state representative
 Malcolm Graham, state senator
 Curtis C. Osborne, attorney
 Rajive Patel, former mayor of East Spencer

All except Patel also ran in the special election.

Withdrew
 Brad Craver, management consultant
 Beverly M. Earle, state representative and nominee for Mayor of Charlotte in 2007
 James "Smuggie" Mitchell, Jr., former Charlotte City Council member and candidate for Mayor of Charlotte in 2013
 Rodney W. Moore, state representative

Polling

Results

Republican primary

Candidates

Nominee
 Vince Coakley, former TV news anchor

Eliminated in primary
 Leon Threatt

Coakley was the only Republican to file for the special election.

Results

General election

Endorsements

Results

District 13

The 13th district is located in northern North Carolina and includes parts of Granville, Wake, Durham, Edgecombe, Franklin, Nash, Vance, Wayne and Wilson counties. The incumbent is Republican George Holding, who has represented the district since 2013. He was elected with 57% of the vote in 2012, succeeding retiring Democratic incumbent Brad Miller. The district has a PVI of R+8.

Holding had considered running for the U.S. Senate but is instead running for re-election.

Republican primary

Candidates

Nominee
George Holding, incumbent U.S. Representative

Democratic primary

Candidates

Nominee
Brenda Cleary, registered nurse and former executive director of the North Carolina Center for Nursing;

Eliminated in primary
Arunava "Ron" Sanyal
Virginia Conlon;

Results

General election

Endorsements

Results

See also
 2014 United States House of Representatives elections
 2014 United States elections

References

External links
U.S. House elections in North Carolina, 2014 at Ballotpedia

United States House of Representatives
North Carolina
2014